Never the Same Again is a 1956 Bildungsroman by Jerry Tschappat, written under the name Gerald Tesch.

Never the Same Again is the story of the coming-of-age of an adolescent boy, Johnny Parish. Johnny forms a close friendship with 30-year-old Roy Davies.

Release details

It was published by G. P. Putnam's Sons, without an ISBN.  It was republished in 1958 by Pyramid Books.

See also

Handy Writers' Colony

Footnotes

1956 American novels
American bildungsromans
Works published under a pseudonym
G. P. Putnam's Sons books
Pedophilia in literature